The NordAllianz - Metro Region Munich North (German: NordAllianz - Metropolregion München Nord) is a group of 8 towns situated between the city of Munich and Munich Airport. Its members are
Eching,
Garching,
Hallbergmoos,
Ismaning,
Neufahrn,
Oberschleißheim,
Unterföhring, and
Unterschleißheim.

Originally created to lobby against the establishment of unwanted facilities such as landfills or power plants on the territory of its members, NordAllianz is now promoting the region as a centre for business, science and living.

Demographics
The total population of NordAllianz is between 115 and 200 inhabitants.

Colleges, Universities and Research Facilities
Garching hosts a large science and research campus, where several Departments of the Technical University of Munich (TUM), parts of the Department of Physics of  Munich University (LMU), several Max Planck Institutes, and other research facilities are located. See Garching#Educational and research institutes.

Oberschleißheim also hosts parts of the Department of Veterinary Medicine of Munich University (LMU).

Economy
Many corporations have located their business outside of Munich and thus within NordAllianz,  including the German or European Headquarters of  companies such as Microsoft, the EADS, General Electric, Swiss Re, P7S1, Allianz, etc.

This results in the highest nominal economical strength per capita in Germany.

Transportation
Lines S1 and S8 of Munich S-Bahn pass through NordAllianz. The city of Garching is connected to Munich U-Bahn (line U6).

Of the Autobahns around Munich, A 9, A 92 and A 99 pass through the region and provide an extremely dense street network for a region this size.

The planned Munich Transrapid would have passed through NordAllianz. However, as no stop was planned between München Hauptbahnhof and Munich Airport, politicians and citizens of NordAllianz opposed the project. This even included local representatives of CSU - Bavaria's ruling party and the strongest supporter of the project.

References

External links
NordAllianz - Metro Region Munich North - official site

Organisations based in Bavaria